Corynidae is a family of hydrozoans in the order Anthomedusae.

Derivation of family name
The family name Corynidae is derived from the Greek word κορυνε ( = korune ) meaning "club" ( in the sense of "cudgel" or "bludgeon" ).

Genera
The following genera are included in the family: 
Bicorona Millard, 1966
Caltsacoryne Toshino, Hamatsu & Uchida, 2021
Cladosarsia Bouillon, 1978
Codonium  Haeckel, 1879
Coryne Gaertner, 1774
Dicyclocoryne Annandale, 1915
Dipurenella Huang, Xu & Guo, 2011
Nannocoryne Bouillon & Grohmann, 1994
Polyorchis A. Agassiz, 1862 
Sarsia Lesson, 1843
Scrippsia Torrey, 1909
Slabberia Forbes, 1846
Spirocodon Haeckel, 1880
Stauridiosarsia Mayer, 1910

References

 
Capitata
Cnidarian families
Taxa named by George Johnston (naturalist)